HMS Venom was a captured in the Caribbean in 1794 that Admiral Sir John Jervis purchased. The Royal Navy commissioned her as a gunbrig under the command of Lieutenant Thomas H. Wilson. In March and April 1794, she participated in the capture of Martinique, St. Lucia, and Guadeloupe. Jervis's expedition restored monarchist rule. The French counter-attacked and recaptured Guadeloupe on 2 June. Jervis and General Sir Charles Grey, the army commander, landed a force to recapture the island but the reinforced French garrison repulsed the British expedition, which withdrew.

Venom was deleted from the lists in 1799 or 1800. After commanding Venom, Wilson assumed command of the hired armed lugger Lark on 21 April 1800.

Prize money: The London Gazette published details for four tranches of prize and head money payments for Jervis's campaign. In all some 36 ships qualified: HMS Asia, Assurance, Avenger, Boyne, Beauleau, Blonde, Bull Dog, Ceres, Dromedary, Experiment, Irresistible, Inspector, Nautilus, Quebec, Roebuck, Rattlesnake, Rose, Retort, Santa Margarita, Solebay, Seaflower, Terpsichore, Ulysses, Undaunted, Vengeance, Veteran, Vesuvius, Winchelsea, Wooolwich (sic), and Zebra. So did six gunboats: Spiteful, Teazer, Tickler, Tormentor, Venom, and Vexor.

In 1847 the Admiralty awarded the Naval General Service Medal with clasp "17 Mar. Boat Service 1794" to all surviving claimants from the action at Fort Royal Bay, Martinique during which the boats of Venom, and others, captured the French frigate Bienvenue, and other vessels.

Notes, citations, and references
Notes

Citations

References

  
 

Ships built in France
Captured ships
Brigs of the Royal Navy